Twin Lakes Township is the name of some places in the U.S. state of Minnesota:

Twin Lakes Township, Carlton County, Minnesota
Twin Lakes Township, Mahnomen County, Minnesota

See also
 Twin Lakes Township (disambiguation)

Minnesota township disambiguation pages